C. Jambulingam Mudaliar CIE was an Indian politician and freedom-fighter who served as a civil court judge and member of the Madras Legislative Council. He was one of the foremost leaders of the Indian National Congress in the 1890s.

Born : 5th December 1857

Died : 24th January 1906

Early life 

Jambulingam studied law and completed his masters in it. He started his practice as a Pleader in Cuddalore and gradually emerged as a judge. He was an important member of the Indian National Congress in the 1890s. In 1893, he was elected to the Madras Legislative Council, one of the first members of the Congress to be elected to the assembly.

Career 

Jambulingam was appointed Officiating judge of the Madras city civil court on September 12, 1902. On June 26, 1902, he was made a Companion of the Order of the Indian Empire.

Indian Independence Movement 

Jambulingam participated in the tenth session of the Indian National Congress held at Madras in 1894 in which he moved a resolution demanding investigation into Indian finances by a Select Committee of the House of Commons on December 28, 1894. He also participated in the eleventh session of the Indian National Congress. In the fifteenth session of the Congress held at Lucknow, Jambulingam was appointed member of the Indian Congress Committee.

Notes

References 

 
 

Companions of the Order of the Indian Empire